Mark Frost (born 23 October 1971) was an English professional darts player from Stoke-on-Trent. He played in Professional Darts Corporation (PDC) events and used the nickname Frosty The Throw Man for his matches. This is not his profession. He works as a scaffolder.

Career

Frost made his televised debut at the 2008 Stan James World Matchplay, where he qualified through the PDC Pro Tour order of merit. He faced Raymond van Barneveld in the first round and put up a good fight, leading on a number of occasions and even led 9-8, eventually losing in a tie-break 11-9 to the five-time World Champion.

Mark lost 3 sets to 0 against Gary Anderson in the World Darts Championship 2017 first round in his debut in the competition.

World Championship results

PDC

 2017: First round (lost to Gary Anderson 0–3)

External links
Mark Frost's stats and profile on Darts Database

Living people
English darts players
Sportspeople from Stoke-on-Trent
1971 births
Professional Darts Corporation former tour card holders